Robert Rauschenberg (1925–2008) was an American painter and graphic artist.

Rauschenberg may also refer to:

Rauschenberg, Hesse, Germany
Rauschenberg (surname)